This is a timeline of the Xinjiang under the rule of the Qing dynasty.

17th century

1690s

18th century

1720s

1730s

1750s

1760s

1770s

19th century

1810s

1820s

References

Bibliography

 .

 (alk. paper) 
 

 

  (paperback).
 

 
 .

 

 
 

 

 

 

 
  
 

 
 

History of Xinjiang
History of Qing dynasty by region